The 1953 Christchurch mayoral election was part of the New Zealand local elections held that same year. In 1953, election were held for the Mayor of Christchurch plus other local government positions. The polling was conducted using the standard first-past-the-post electoral method.

Campaign
Sitting mayor Robert Macfarlane was re-elected with the largest majority he had won so far against city councillor James Hay. The Labour Party lost two seats on the Council but retained their majority, winning ten seats to the nine won by the Citizens' Association.

A major talking point in the lead up to the election was the potential of a clash with the 1953 Royal Tour. There were proposals to postpone local elections until early 1954 over fears of reduced turnout due to a conflicted schedule. The proposals were considered by the Minister of Internal Affairs William Bodkin, who ultimately decided against it.

Mayoralty results
The following table gives the election results:

Council results

References

Mayoral elections in Christchurch
1953 elections in New Zealand
Politics of Christchurch
November 1953 events in New Zealand
1950s in Christchurch